Swap spreads are the difference between the swap rate (a fixed interest rate) and a corresponding government bond yield with the same maturity (Treasury securities in the case of the United States).

For example, if the current market rate for a five-year swap is 1.35 percent and the current yield on the five-year Treasury note is 1.33 percent, the five-year swap spread would be 0.02 percentage points, or 2 basis points.

Often, fixed income prices will be quoted in "SWAPS +", wherein the swap rate is added to a given number of basis points. The swap rate there is simply the yield on an equal-maturity Treasury plus the swap spread.

Swap spread became a popular indication of credit spread in Europe during the 1990s.

References

Financial markets
Swaps (finance)
Credit risk